Franck Eddy Signorino (born 19 September 1981) is a French former professional footballer who played as a left-back.

Career
Born in Nogent-sur-Marne, Val-de-Marne, Signorino made his professional debut with FC Metz, helping it return to Ligue 1 in his second year. After a final season where he paired up with Franck Ribéry, he signed for FC Nantes.

In 2007, following Nantes' relegation from the first division, a host of clubs, including Deportivo de La Coruña, Getafe CF, UD Almería, Birmingham City and Newcastle United expressed an interest in the player. Eventually, Signorino moved to Getafe on 30 July 2007, making his competitive debut against Tottenham Hotspur in the group stage of the UEFA Cup following a period of injury (2–1 away win, 90 minutes played). His La Liga debut came on 16 December, featuring 67 minutes as a substitute in a 3–1 home defeat to Villarreal CF.

Signorino spent the entire the 2008–09 campaign in the sidelines, nursing a serious tibia injury. In January 2010, after being demoted to third-string left-back, he signed with second division side FC Cartagena on loan; in the last minutes of the following summer transfer window he was cut by Getafe and, subsequently, joined S. du Pays de Charleroi on a one-year contract, appearing regularly for the Belgian team but suffering relegation from the Pro League.

On 5 September 2011, Signorino agreed to a one-year deal with Stade Lavallois, returning to his country after four years. He continued to compete in his country's top division in the following years, with Stade de Reims and Metz.

Honours
Individual
Ligue 1 Team of the Year: 2002–03

References

External links
 
 
 
 

1981 births
Living people
Sportspeople from Nogent-sur-Marne
French footballers
Footballers from Val-de-Marne
Association football defenders
Ligue 1 players
Ligue 2 players
FC Metz players
FC Nantes players
Stade Lavallois players
Stade de Reims players
La Liga players
Segunda División players
Getafe CF footballers
FC Cartagena footballers
Belgian Pro League players
R. Charleroi S.C. players
French expatriate footballers
Expatriate footballers in Spain
Expatriate footballers in Belgium
French expatriate sportspeople in Spain
French expatriate sportspeople in Belgium